Bessie Wheeler (1876–?), was a painter about whom little is known.  She painted portraits of people encountered on the streets of Honolulu around 1900.  She contributed illustrations to Thrum's Hawaiian Annual and was a member of the Kilohana Art League.

References

1876 births
19th-century American painters
20th-century American painters
American women painters
Painters from Hawaii
Year of death missing
20th-century American women artists
19th-century American women artists